Aesa or Aisa was a town of ancient Macedonia. Aesa belonged to the Delian League since it appears on a tribute list to Athens in 434/3 BCE. The editors of the Barrington Atlas of the Greek and Roman World identify Aesa with Lisaea, a city mentioned by Herodotus but otherwise unknown in other sources.

The site of Aesa is tentatively located near modern Nea Kallikrateia.

References

Populated places in ancient Macedonia
Former populated places in Greece
Members of the Delian League